Vennavalkudi (வெண்ணவால்குடி) is a panchayat Village in Alangudi thaluk, Pudukkottai district, in the state of Tamil Nadu, India.

Geography
Vennavalkudi is a kallar nadu its a head place of vennaval nattu kallars, inIt is 22 kilometers away from Pudukkottai and is well connected by public transport.

 is the historical name of Vennavalkudi (வெண்ணாவல்குடி) This village has some internal division of streets such as
 தெற்கு அக்ரஹாரம்(South Agraharam) Mutharaiyar An Kallars 
 வடக்கு அக்ரஹாரம்(North Agraharam) Mutharaiyar 
 வெண்ணாவல்குடி(Vennvalkudi) Kallars

Sub Villages Under Vennavaludi Papanchayat
 Vallikadu Mutharaiyar 
 Ramachandrapuram
 Menatrayankudi, irupu
 Myladikadu,  Mutharaiyar
 kulayankadu, Mutharaiyar
 Thenikadu,  Mutharaiyar
 Pasuvayal, Mutharaiyar
 Mathavadikadu
sothiyankadu Mutharaiyar

Temples
 Arulmigu Malai Mariamman Temple-Senthakudi
 Sri Vetriandavar alayam-Venkatakulam
  Vijaya Ganapathi Temple வடக்கு அக்ரஹாரம்(North Agraharam)
 Sir Karuppayi Amman & Suriya Karuppar Temple Thenikadu

Population
Vennavalkudi is a large village located in Alangudi taluk of Pudukkottai district, Tamil Nadu with total 1464 families residing. The Vennavalkudi village has population of 6260 of which 3109 are males while 3151 are females as per Population Census 2011.

People
Although there are Few castes are over there with majority of Mutharaiyar

Politics
This village belongs to Alangudi (State Assembly Constituency) is part of the Sivaganga (Lok mutharaiyar community constituency)

Nearby villages 
Muthupattinam
Palaiyur
Kulavoipatti
Dakshinapuram
Venkatakulam
Vennavalkudi
Arayapatti
Kilayur
Sendakudi
soothiyankadu
Villages in Pudukkottai district